The 1989–90 Slovenian Republic Cup was the penultimate season of Slovenia's football knockout competition before the establishment of the Slovenian Football Cup. It was contested by all Slovenian clubs except Olimpija and played by the East/West system.

Round of 16

|colspan="3" style="background-color:#D0D0D0" align=left|East

|-
|colspan="3" style="background-color:#D0D0D0" align=left|West

|}

Quarter-finals

|colspan="3" style="background-color:#D0D0D0" align=left|East

|-
|colspan="3" style="background-color:#D0D0D0" align=left|West

|}

Semi-finals

|colspan="3" style="background-color:#D0D0D0" align=left|East

|-
|colspan="3" style="background-color:#D0D0D0" align=left|West

|}

Final

References
NZS. 1995. 75 let NZS, Ljubljana

Slovenian Football Cup seasons
Cup
Slovenian Cup